The women's pole vault at the 2015 World Championships in Athletics was held at the Beijing National Stadium on 24 and 26 August.  2013 Champion and world record holder Yelena Isinbayeva did not defend her title having given birth to her first child in 2014.

Fourteen athletes qualified at 4.55, but two were unable to get over the opening height of 4.50 in the finals.  Minna Nikkanen set her National Record at 4.60, but there were still seven in at 4.70, five of them with clean rounds to that point making for a five-way tie including Angelica Bengtsson's National Record and returning silver medalist Jenn Suhr, who had confidently passed to 4.60. 4.80 decided the medalists with Nikoleta Kyriakopoulou taking it on the first attempt to take over the lead. 2011 champion Fabiana Murer took it on her second attempt and was ahead of Yarisley Silva who had struggled earlier at 4.70.  Both Silva and Murer made 4.85 on their first attempt, giving Murer the lead.  Murer also again equalled her own South American record.  Kyriakopoulou missed at what would have been her National Record.  Having no strategic advantage to clearing it with one miss, she passed to 4.90.  Everybody missed their first two attempts at 4.90, making Kyriakopoulou the bronze medalist.  On her final attempt, Silva made it, to leap past Murer into gold medal position.  Murer was unable to answer on her final attempt and had to settle for silver. Murer was pleased to win a medal in Beijing seven years after the 2008 Olympics, where she underperformed following her poles being misplaced by the organization, and became optimistic for the 2016 Summer Olympics at her own Brazil, when she will have to set a masters world record to be in the medal hunt.

Records
Prior to the competition, the established records were as follows.

Qualification standards

Schedule

Results

Qualification
Qualification: 4.60 m (Q) or at least 12 best performers (q).

Final
The final was started at 19:00.

References

Pole vault
Pole vault at the World Athletics Championships
2015 in women's athletics